Mesogyne is a genus of plants in the family Moraceae.  The genus is found in east Africa.

Species include:

 Mesogyne henriquesii Engl.
 Mesogyne insignis Engl.

References 

 
Moraceae genera
Taxonomy articles created by Polbot